Jahurul Islam Talukdar (born 1921 or 1922) is a Bangladesh Nationalist Party politician and former member of parliament for Pabna-1.

Career 
Talukdar was elected to parliament for Pabna-1 as a Bangladesh Nationalist Party candidate in the 1979 Bangladeshi general election.

References 

Living people
Year of birth missing (living people)
People from Pabna District
Bangladesh Nationalist Party politicians
2nd Jatiya Sangsad members